Queen Elizabeth High School (QEHS) is a coeducational high school and sixth form located in Hexham, Northumberland, England.

History
The school was founded in 1599. Thomas Stackhouse, afterwards an Anglican clergyman and theologian, was headmaster of the school from 1701 to 1704. The school is in a multi-academy trust (Hadrian Learning Trust) with Hexham Middle School. The head of school is Neal Seaton, and Graeme Atkins is the Executive Headteacher, having previously headed Northwood School. The school currently uses one building, split into 4 sections; Causey, Leazes, Fellside and The Hydro.

The school received a £36 million investment from the government and Northumberland County Council to expand the "Hydro" building, while demolishing the old 'lower school' and adding state of the art facilities. The new building also incorporates Hexham Middle School, although the students do not mix. During this time, the school rebranded to a new design.

The work was completed in September 2021, after a short delay.

Admissions
It has approximately 1300 students, of whom 380 are in the Sixth Form. Northumberland LEA currently operates a three-tier system, so QEHS has students aged between 13 and 18.

The school is part of the Tynedale Virtual College, a collaboration between the four high schools in the Tyne Valley and Northumberland College.  The TVC seeks to provide vocational learning across the area.

It is just off Allendale Road (B6305) in the west of Hexham.

Academic performance
On 21 March 2019 an Ofsted inspection judged the school to be 'Good'.

Sport
The school has a rowing club called the Queen Elizabeth High School Rowing Club,

Alumni
 Matthew Wells (rower), British Olympic Rower
 Charlie Mackesy, Artist
 Shaun Vipond, Footballer
 Joe Grey, Footballer

References

External links
 Northumberland Grid for Learning

Upper schools in Northumberland
Educational institutions established in the 1590s
1599 establishments in England
Academies in Northumberland
Hexham